Fofonoff is a Skolt Saami surname.

Notable people with the surname include:

 Kati-Claudia Fofonoff (1947–2011), Skolt Saami author
 Matleena Fofonoff (née Gauriloff, b. 1949), Skolt master craftsman and artisan and recipient of the Skolt of the Year Award in 2009
 Elias Fofonoff , recipient of the Skolt of the Year Award in 2008
 Ville-Riiko Fofonoff, the first person to take the mother tongue portion of the Finnish matriculation exam in Skolt Saami and recipient of the Skolt of the Year Award in 2012

Sami-language surnames
Surnames from given names